Yevgeni Albertovich Titov (13 February 1964 – 27 February 2015) was a Russian professional footballer.

Titov played in the Russian Premier League with FC Zhemchuzhina Sochi.

References

External links
 

1964 births
2015 deaths
Soviet footballers
Russian footballers
Russian Premier League players
Russian expatriate footballers
Expatriate footballers in Finland
FC Chernomorets Novorossiysk players
FC Zhemchuzhina Sochi players
FC Ilves players
Association football midfielders
FC Dynamo Vologda players
Veikkausliiga players
FC Bulat Cherepovets players